Taina Itkonen (born Taina Impiö on 10 April 1956) is a Finnish former cross-country skier who competed during the late 1970s. She won a gold medal in the 4 × 5 km relay at the 1978 FIS Nordic World Ski Championships in Lahti, and finished fifth in the 10 km event at those same championships. She also competed in the women's 5 kilometres at the 1976 Winter Olympics.

Now she works as a PE teacher in Sodankylä.

Cross-country skiing results

Olympic Games

World Championships
 1 medal – (1 gold)

References

External links
World Championship results 

1956 births
Living people
People from Ranua
Finnish female cross-country skiers
FIS Nordic World Ski Championships medalists in cross-country skiing
Olympic cross-country skiers of Finland
Cross-country skiers at the 1976 Winter Olympics
Sportspeople from Lapland (Finland)